Deborah Hutton (born 20 December 1961) is an Australian media personality. She is a television presenter, magazine editor, ambassador, and spokesmodel. She is a supporter of several charities including The Skin Cancer Foundation Inc.

Born in England, United Kingdom, she immigrated to Australia when very young. She and her mother travelled extensively from Queensland to Papua New Guinea before finally settling in Sydney.

Career
Hutton left school and home at the age of 16 for a modelling career. She was on the cover of Cosmopolitan in October 1978 and then worked for Vivien's Modelling Agency (Sydney). At 18, she was contracted with Ford Modelling Agency in New York City.

Television host
In 1989, Hutton was co-host of the Ten Network quiz show, Superquiz with Mike Walsh. The weekly series, a remake of the former long-running quiz show Pick A Box, debuted in July but only lasted until the end of the year.

In June 1994 the Nine Network approached Hutton to present the new series of Looking Good. The series was a success with two million people tuning in,  and often won its time slot in the national ratings. Hutton returned to host Looking Good again in 1995. During 1996 and 1997, Hutton appeared on the Nine Network as their resident authority on fashion, beauty & style.

Hutton has been the host of the top rating Location Location, Amazing Homes, and Celebrity Overhaul. She has also been a regular contributor on the Nine Network's Fresh food programme, been a guest reporter on Getaway and hosted Nine's one-hour special Second Chance.

In 2011, Hutton moved to Foxtel, hosting shows on the BIO Channel.

From November 2012 to 2015, Hutton was the presenter of the Foxtel Movie Show. In September 2015, Foxtel Arts launched a new monthly art show called Event, hosted by Hutton. Filmed in the Foxtel studios, Event explored Australian music, theatre, visual arts and books.

Editor
For more than ten years Hutton was an editor of The Australian Women's Weekly. She started with the beauty pages and then went on to become the fashion editor and then editor-at-large (Home).

Business ventures
For more than 10 years, Hutton was the national ambassador for Myer Grace Bros Department Store Group. She represented them as a spokesperson and hosted a variety of corporate functions, VIP nights, and seminars.

Hutton was an ambassador for Qantas for over 10 years. In that role she was the presenter on the in-flight video guide, and acted as host for major Qantas events. Hutton has also been a spokesperson for Holden endorsing and promoting its cars.

In September 2004, Hutton launched her range of homewares "Living with Deborah Hutton" for Kmart. In 2006, she became the brand ambassador for Olay Regenerist and created her branded eyewear "Deborah Hutton Optical". She was the spokesperson for the "At Home at Hyatt" campaign for the Lend Lease Group residential development at Hyatt Regency Coolum on the Sunshine Coast.

In 2011, Hutton launched her digital media community "Balance by Deborah Hutton". The site hosted weekly video interviews with women around the world.

Deborah Hutton is an ambassador of the Australian Women Chamber of Commerce and Industry (AWCCI) and sits on the AWCCI Advisory Board.

Charity
Hutton is Ambassador for the Skin Cancer Foundation Inc, the Olivia Newton-John Cancer and Wellness Centre and supports the work of the Starlight Children's Foundation.

Personal life
Deborah Hutton had a seven-year relationship with former Australian hockey player Danni Roche until their break up in December 2007. 
In 2015, Hutton bought a $3.8million house in the Sydney suburb of Bronte, with her partner, Robert Dulhunty. In August 2018, Dulhunty told police he had chased a trespasser from the premises. Security vision was obtained of Dulhunty buying items, supposedly left by the intruder, from a convenience store the day before the event. In January 2019, Dulhunty was convicted of six offences, including stalking and intimidation, property damage, and making a fake triple zero call. He was also ordered to pay the NSW Police $13,040, to compensate for the time they wasted on the case.

Bibliography 
Hutton, Deborah & Australian Women's Weekly. (2015).  The Australian Women's Weekly: my love affair with food. Sydney, NSW: Bauer Media Group.

References

External links

 
 Balance by Deborah Hutton
 

1961 births
Australian television personalities
Women television personalities
English television personalities
Living people
Australian magazine editors
Australian female models
English emigrants to Australia
English magazine editors
English female models
Women magazine editors